"I Belong To Glasgow" is a song written and recorded by the music hall entertainer Will Fyffe, in 1920. It has also been performed by Danny Kaye, Eartha Kitt, Gracie Fields and Kirk Douglas.

According to Albert Mackie's The Scotch Comedians (1973), Fyffe got the inspiration for the song from a drunk he met at Glasgow Central Station. The drunk was "genial and demonstrative" and "laying off about Karl Marx and John Barleycorn with equal enthusiasm". Fyffe asked him: "Do you belong to Glasgow?" and the man replied: "At the moment, at the moment, Glasgow belongs to me."

If your money, you spend,
You’ve nothing to lend,
Isn’t that all the better for you.

The song speaks of drink, in a period where temperance campaigns were very common, and shows a typical music hall attitude to the supposedly tyrannical wife. The monologue accompanying the song is the origin of several popular humorous catch phrases, including "under the affluence of incohol". The entertainer Harry Lauder was offered the song, but turned it down since it praised strong drink.

The song was used in the 1955 film The Colditz Story, but the lyric was modified to "I Belong To Colditz".

References

External links
Song Lyrics 
I Belong To Glasgow - Animated Footage on Vimeo 

Glasgow
Scottish songs
Music hall songs
1927 songs